St Gabriel Fenchurch (or Fen Church as recorded on the Ordnance Survey) was a parish church in the Langbourn Ward  of the City of London, destroyed in the Great Fire of London and not rebuilt.

History

At the beginning of the 17th century, John Stow wrote in his description of Fenchurch Street: "In the midst of this street  standeth a small parish church called St Gabriel Fen Church, corruptly Fan church". The dedication to St Gabriel is first recorded in 1517. Before that it had been known as St Mary's. Richard Newcourt  wrote:...this Church hath all along in the London Registry been recorded by the Name of S. Mary Fencherch, till the Year 1517. for then is the first time I find it there call'd by the Name of S. Gabriel Fencherch; and the next
Year after All Saints Fencherch; whence, I conjecture, it may, probably, be dedicated to the Blessed Virgin Mary, to the Holy Angel Gabriel, and to All Saints.
The church was lengthened by nine feet in 1631.  This and other improvements were done at a cost to the parish of £587 10s. Thomas Clark,  a glazier, gave the church an east window, with the Royal Arms and the motto "Touch Not Mine Anointed".

Along with the majority of the parish churches in the City, St Gabriel's was destroyed by the  Great Fire in 1666. A Rebuilding Act was passed in 1670 and a committee set up under  Sir Christopher Wren. It decided to rebuild 51 of the churches, but St Gabriel's was not among them. Instead the parish was united to  that of St Margaret Pattens, although its land holding was not finally resolved until 13 years later, and charitable bequests continued to be made using the old name.  The land on which the church had stood was incorporated into the roadway, but part of the churchyard survived in Fen Court.

Notable tombs in the church included that of Benedict Spinola, the Genoese Elizabethan banker.

References

12th-century church buildings in England
1666 disestablishments in England
Churches destroyed in the Great Fire of London and not rebuilt
Churches in the City of London
Former buildings and structures in the City of London